Filodrillia crebrespirata is a species of sea snail, a marine gastropod mollusk in the family Borsoniidae.

Description
The length of the shell attains 5.5 mm, its width 2.1 mm.

(Original description) This shell is more solid and opaque than Filodrillia lacteola. It has 15 spiral lirae in the penultimate whorl and 50 in the body whorl, crossed by crowded accremental striae.

Distribution
This marine species is endemic to Australia and occurs off Southern Australia.

References

crebrespirata
Gastropods of Australia
Gastropods described in 1909